Light You Up is the eighth studio album release from American rock singer-songwriter Shawn Mullins.

Track listing
California
Light You Up
Murphy's Song
No Blue Sky
The Ghost of Johnny Cash
Tinseltown
I Knew a Girl
Catoosa County
You Make It Better
Can't Remember Summer
Love Will Find a Way

References

2010 albums
Shawn Mullins albums
Vanguard Records albums